RVV may stand for:

 Reeve Aleutian Airways, a former American airline (ICAO code)
 Russell Viper Venom.  See Dilute Russell's viper venom time,
 Raad van Vlaanderen (World War I) - the council of Flanders
 Raad van Verzet, a Dutch resistance organisation during World War II
 Tour of Flanders,  Tour of Flanders (a cycling classic)
 Raivavae Airport (IATA code RVV)